The 1965 season was the Hawthorn Football Club's 41st season in the Victorian Football League and 64th overall. As of 2022, this was the last time Hawthorn finished last.

Fixture

Premiership Season

Golden Fleece Cup

Ladder

References

Hawthorn Football Club seasons